LDMA may refer to:

 Linked direct memory access, a type of direct memory access controllers
 Louisiana Digital Media Archive, an archive containing the state archives' multimedia and public broadcasting collections
 Lost Dutchman's Mining Association, see Stanton, Arizona
 Left-Democratic Manch, Assam, see Revolutionary Communist Party of India